The Atigun River  is a river in the Endicott Mountains in northern Alaska. The source is a glacier terminus, from which it flows northeast to the Sagavanirktok River 20 miles south of its junction with the Ribdon River. It is 45 miles long.

References

Rivers of North Slope Borough, Alaska